Roger Berrio Hernández (born October 30, 1972) is a retired male weightlifter from Colombia, who twice won a medal for his native South American country at the Pan American Games: in 1995 and 1999. He twice competed at the Summer Olympics (1992 and 1996), finishing in 26th place in the men's featherweight division in Atlanta, Georgia (1996).

Major results

References
 sports-reference

1972 births
Living people
Colombian male weightlifters
Olympic weightlifters of Colombia
Weightlifters at the 1992 Summer Olympics
Weightlifters at the 1996 Summer Olympics
Weightlifters at the 1995 Pan American Games
Weightlifters at the 1999 Pan American Games
Pan American Games silver medalists for Colombia
Pan American Games bronze medalists for Colombia
Pan American Games medalists in weightlifting
Medalists at the 1995 Pan American Games
Medalists at the 1999 Pan American Games
20th-century Colombian people
21st-century Colombian people